Anthony M. McClone (January 6, 1876 – July 4, 1938) was an American politician and businessman.

Born in the town of Deer Creek, Outagamie County, Wisconsin, McClone grew up on the family farm. He worked at Chelsea Lumber Company and then purchased a farm. He served on the town board and was chairman of the town board. In 1919, McClone served in the Wisconsin State Assembly and was a Republican. In 1931, McClone moved to Appleton, Wisconsin and was a salesman for Four Wheel Drive Company. McClone died in Appleton, Wisconsin after a long illness.

Notes

1876 births
1938 deaths
People from Outagamie County, Wisconsin
Businesspeople from Wisconsin
Farmers from Wisconsin
Wisconsin city council members
Mayors of places in Wisconsin
Republican Party members of the Wisconsin State Assembly